Mythical Beasties is an anthology of themed fantasy and science fiction short stories on the subject of legendary creatures edited by Isaac Asimov, Martin H. Greenberg and Charles G. Waugh as the sixth volume in their Isaac Asimov's Magical Worlds of Fantasy series. It was first published in paperback by Signet/New American Library in May 1986. The first British edition was issued under the alternate title Mythic Beasts in trade paperback by Robinson in 1988.

The book collects thirteen novellas, novelettes and short stories by various fantasy and science fiction authors.

Contents
"Centaur Fielder for the Yankees" (Edward D. Hoch)
"The Ice Dragon" (George R. R. Martin)
"Prince Prigio" (Andrew Lang)
"The Gorgon" (Tanith Lee)
"The Griffin and the Minor Canon" (Frank R. Stockton)
"The Kragen" (Jack Vance)
"The Little Mermaid" (Hans Christian Andersen)
"Letters from Laura" (Mildred Clingerman)
"The Triumph of Pegasus" (Frank A. Javor)
"Caution! Inflammable!" (Thomas N. Scortia)
"The Pyramid Project" (Robert F. Young)
"The Silken-Swift" (Theodore Sturgeon)
"Mood Wendigo" (Thomas A. Easton)

References

1986 anthologies
Fantasy anthologies
Science fiction anthologies
Martin H. Greenberg anthologies
Isaac Asimov anthologies
Signet Books books